Flugfélag Vestmannaeyja (1983–2010)  was a regional airline based on the Vestmannaeyjar archipelago, Iceland. It was founded to provide aviation services for the people of Vestmannaeyjar and also tourists visiting Vestmannaeyjar. It operated both scheduled and charter services along with sightseeing and cargo flights. It also took care of all ambulance flights from Vestmannaeyjar. The airline is no longer operational.

History 

The airline was founded in 1983 to attract more tourists to Vestmannaeyjar and provide services to the inhabitants. In 2001 Flugfélag Vestmannaeyja started scheduled flights between Vestmannaeyjar and Bakki, and 30.000 passengers are carried on this flight each year.

With the impending opening of a new harbor and ferry terminal close to Bakki airport and with dwindling business the airline has ceased operations as of May 2010.

Destinations 
As of May 2009, Flugfélag Vestmannaeyja served the following destinations:

 Bakki - Bakki Airport 
 Selfoss - Selfoss Airport 
 Heimaey - Vestmannaeyjar Airport

Fleet 
Flugfélag Vestmannaeyja fleet (as of April 2008):

2 Partenavia P.68
1 Piper Chieftain
1 Britten Norman Islander

References

External links
Flugfélag Vestmannaeyja

Defunct airlines of Iceland
Airlines established in 1983
Airlines disestablished in 2010